In genetics, a polygenic score (PGS), also called a polygenic index (PGI), polygenic risk score (PRS), genetic risk score, or genome-wide score, is a number that summarizes the estimated effect of many genetic variants on an individual's phenotype, typically calculated as a weighted sum of trait-associated alleles. It reflects an individual's estimated genetic predisposition for a given trait and can be used as a predictor for that trait. In other words, it gives an estimate of how likely an individual is to have a given trait only based on genetics, without taking environmental factors into account. Polygenic scores are widely used in animal breeding and plant breeding (usually termed genomic prediction or genomic selection) due to their efficacy in improving livestock breeding and crops. In humans, polygenic scores are typically generated from genome-wide association study (GWAS) data.

Recent progress in genetics has enabled the creation of polygenic predictors of complex human traits, including risk for many important complex diseases, which are typically affected by many genetic variants that each confer a small effect on overall risk. In a polygenic risk predictor the lifetime (or age-range) risk for the disease is a numerical function captured by the score which depends on the states of thousands of individual genetic variants (i.e., single nucleotide polymorphisms, or SNPs).

Polygenic scores are an area of intense scientific investigation: hundreds of papers are written each year on topics such as learning algorithms for genomic prediction, new predictor training, validation testing of predictors, clinical application of PRS. In 2018, the American Heart Association named polygenic risk scores as one of the major breakthroughs in research in heart disease and stroke.

Background 
DNA in living organisms is the recipe book for creating life. In humans, DNA is a string of four nucleotide bases (Thymine, Guanine, Cytosine, and Adenosine) found across 23 chromosomes. In total, each cell in the human body contains about 3 billion bases. The human genome can be broadly separated into coding and non-coding sequences. The coding genome makes up a small portion of all the bases and encodes instructions for genes, some of which code for proteins. The function of the remaining non-coding and other parts of the human genome continues to be studied by scientists. Genome-wide association studies enable mapping phenotypes or traits in humans or non-human species to variation in nucleotide bases in human populations. Improvements in methodology and studies with large cohorts have enabled mapping many traits, some of which are diseases, with the human genome. The knowledge of which variations and how strongly they influence specific traits form the key component for the construction of polygenic scores in humans.

History 

Although polygenic risk scores gained increased attention within humans, the basic idea was first introduced for selective plant and animal breeding. Similar to the modern approaches of constructing a polygenic risk score, an individual's breeding value was the sum of single nucleotide polymorphism weight by their effect on a trait.  These methods were first applied to humans in the late 2000s, starting with a proposal in 2007 that these scores could be used in human genetics to identify individuals at high risk for disease. This was successfully applied in empirical research for the first time in 2009 by researchers who organized a genome-wide association study (GWAS) of schizophrenia to construct scores of risk propensity. This study was also the first to use the term polygenic score for a prediction drawn from a linear combination of single-nucleotide polymorphism (SNP) genotypes, which was able to explain 3% of the variance in schizophrenia.

Calculating a polygenic risk score 
A polygenic score (PGS) or Polygenic Index (PGI) is constructed from the "weights" derived from a genome-wide association study (GWAS). In a GWAS, single nucleotide polymorphisms (SNPs) are tested for an association between cases and controls. The results from a GWAS provides the strength of the association, e.g. the effect size, and a p-value for statistical significance. The effect size derived from GWAS for a SNP is often referred to as the 'weight'.  A typical polygenic risk score is then calculated by adding together the number of risk-increasing alleles across a large number of SNPs, each multiplied by this weight. In mathematical form, the estimated polygenic score  is obtained as the sum across m number of SNPs with risk-increasing alleles weighted by their weights,  .

This idea can be generalized to the study of any trait, and is an example of the more general mathematical term regression analysis.

Key considerations when developing polygenic scores 
Methods for generating polygenic scores in humans are an active area of research. A key consideration in developing polygenic scores is which SNPs and the number of SNPs to include. The simplest so-called "pruning and thresholding" method of construction sets weights equal to the coefficient estimates from a regression of the trait on each genetic variant. The included SNPs may be selected using an algorithm that attempts to ensure that each marker is approximately independent. Independence of each SNP is important for the score's predictive accuracy. SNPs that are physically close to each other are more likely to be in linkage disequilibrium, meaning they are often inherited together and therefore don't provide independent predictive power.  That's what's referred to as 'pruning'. The 'thresholding' refers to only including SNPs that meet a specific p-value threshold. Penalized regression can also be used to construct polygenic scores. Penalized regression can be interpreted as placing informative prior probabilities on how many genetic variants are expected to affect a trait, and the distribution of their effect sizes. In other words, these methods in effect "penalize" the large coefficients in a regression model and shrink them conservatively. One popular tool for this approach is "PRS-CS". Another approach is to use Bayesian methods first proposed in 2001. Bayesian approaches directly incorporate genetic features of the trait being studied and genomic features like linkage disequilibrium. One of the most popular modern Bayesian methods uses "linkage disequilibrium prediction" (LDpred for short). Many other approaches to develop polygenic risk scores continue to be described. For example, by incorporating effect sizes from populations of different ancestry, the predictive ability of PRS can be improved. Incorporating knowledge of the functional roles of specific genomic chunks can also lead to improved utility of polygenic risk scores. Studies have examined the performances of these methods on standardized datasets

Application to humans 
As the number of genome-wide association studies has exploded, along with rapid advances in methods for calculating polygenic scores, its most obvious application is in clinical settings for disease prediction or risk stratification. It is important not to over- or under-state the value of polygenic scores. A key advantage of quantifying polygenic contribution for each individual is that the genetic liability does not change over an individual's lifespan. However, while a disease may have strong genetic contributions, the risk arising from one's genetics has to be interpreted in the context of environmental factors. For example, even if an individual has a high genetic risk for alcoholism, that risk is obsolete if that individual is never exposed to alcohol.

Clinical utility of polygenic scores 
A landmark study examining the role of polygenic risk scores in cardiovascular disease invigorated interest the clinical potential of polygenic scores. This study demonstrated that an individual with the highest polygenic risk score (top 1%) had a lifetime cardiovascular risk >10% which was comparable to those with rare genetic variants. This comparison is important because clinical practice can be influenced by knowing which individuals have this rare genetic cause of cardiovascular disease. Since this study, polygenic risk scores have shown promise for disease prediction across other traits. Polygenic risk scores have been studied heavily in obesity, coronary artery disease, diabetes, breast cancer, prostate cancer, Alzheimer's disease and psychiatric diseases.

Predictive performance in humans 
For humans, while most polygenic scores are not predictive enough to diagnose disease, they could potentially be used in addition to other covariates (such as age, BMI, smoking status) to improve estimates of disease susceptibility. However, even if a polygenic score might not make reliable diagnostic predictions across an entire population, it may still make very accurate predictions for outliers at extreme high or low risk. The clinical utility may therefore still be large even if average measures of prediction performance are moderate.

Although issues such as poorer predictive performance in individuals of non-European ancestry limit widespread use, several authors have noted that many causal variants that underlie common genetic variation in Europeans are shared across different continents for (e.g.) BMI and type 2 diabetes in African populations as well as schizophrenia in Chinese populations. Other researchers recognize that polygenic under-prediction in non-European population should galvanize new GWAS that prioritize greater genetic diversity in order to maximize the potential health benefits brought about by predictive polygenic scores. Significant scientific efforts are being made to this end .

Embryo genetic screening is common with millions biopsied and tested each year worldwide. Genotyping methods have been developed so that the embryo genotype can be determined to high precision. Testing for aneuploidy and monogenetic diseases has increasingly become established over decades, whereas tests for polygenic diseases have begun to be employed more recently, having been first used in embryo selection in 2019.
The use of polygenic scores for embryo selection has been criticised due to alleged ethical and safety issues as well as limited practical utility. However, trait-specific evaluations claiming the contrary have been put forth and ethical arguments for PGS-based embryo selection have also been made. The topic continues to be an active area of research not only within genomics but also within clinical applications and ethics.

As of 2019, polygenic scores from well over a hundred phenotypes have been developed from genome-wide association statistics. These include scores that can be categorized as anthropometric, behavioural, cardiovascular, non-cancer illness, psychiatric/neurological, and response to treatment/medication.

Examples of disease prediction performance 
When predicting disease risk, a PGS gives a continuous score that estimates the risk of having or getting the disease, within some pre-defined time span. A common metric for evaluating such continuous estimates of yes/no questions (see Binary classification) is the area under the ROC curve (AUC). Some example results of PGS performance, as measured in AUC (0 ≤ AUC ≤ 1 where a larger number implies better prediction), include:
 In 2018, AUC ≈ 0.64 for coronary disease using ~120,000 British individuals.
 In 2019, AUC ≈ 0.63 for breast cancer, developed from ~95,000 case subjects and ~75,000 controls of European ancestry.
 In 2019, AUC ≈ 0.71 for hypothyroidism for ~24,000 case subjects and ~463,00 controls of European ancestry.
 In 2020, AUC ≈ 0.71 for schizophrenia, using 90 cohorts including ~67,000 case subjects and ~94,000 controls with ~80% of European ancestry and ~20% of East Asian ancestry. Note that these results use purely genetic information as input; including additional information such as age and sex often greatly improves the predictions. The coronary disease predictor and the hypothyroidism predictor above achieve AUCs of ~ 0.80 and ~0.78, respectively, when also including age and sex.

Importance of sample size 

The performance of a polygenic predictor is highly dependent on the size of the dataset that is available for analysis and ML training. Recent scientific progress in prediction power relies heavily on the creation and expansion of large biobanks containing data for both genotypes and phenotypes of very many individuals. As of 2021, there exist several biobanks with hundreds of thousands samples, i.e., data entries with both genetic and trait information for each individual (see for instance the incomplete list of biobanks).

With the use of these growing biobanks, data from many thousands of individuals are used to detect the relevant variants for a specific trait. Exactly how many are required depends very much on the trait in question. Typically, increasing levels of prediction are observed until a plateau phase where the performance levels off and does not change much when increasing the sample size even further. This is the limit of how accurate a polygenic predictor that only uses genetic information can be and is set by the heritability of the specific trait. The sample size required to reach this performance level for a certain trait is determined by the complexity of the underlying genetic architecture and the distribution of genetic variance in the sampled population. This sample size dependence is illustrated in the figure for hypothyroidism, hypertension and type 2 diabetes.

Note again, that current methods to construct polygenic predictors are sensitive to the ancestries present in the data. As of 2021, most available data have been primarily of populations with European ancestry, which is the reason why PGS generally perform better within this ancestry. The construction of more diverse biobanks with successful recruitment from all ancestries is required to rectify this skewed access to and benefits from PGS-based medicine.

Current usage of human polygenic risk scores 

Provision of PRS directly to individuals is already undergoing research trials in health systems around the world, but is not yet offered as standard of care. The majority of current usage by individuals is therefore through consumer genetic testing, where a number of private companies report PRS for a number of diseases and traits. Consumers download their genotype (genetic variant) data and upload them into online PRS calculators, e.g. Scripps Health, Impute.me or Color Genomics. The most frequently reported motivation for individuals to seek out PRS reports is general curiosity (98.2%), and the reactions are generally mixed with common misinterpretations. It is speculated that usage of PRS directly by patients could contribute to treatment choices, but that more data is needed to allow development of PRS in this context. A more typical current use case, is therefore that clinicians face individuals with commercially derived disease-specific PRS in the expectation that the clinician will interpret them, something that may create extra burdens for the clinical care system.

Benefits in humans 
Unlike many other clinical laboratory or imaging methods, an individual's germ-line genetic risk can be calculated at birth for a variety of diseases after sequencing their DNA once. Thus, polygenic scores may ultimately be a cost-effective measure that can be informative for clinical management. Moreover, the polygenic risk score may be informative across an individual's lifespan helping to quantify the genetic lifelong risk for certain diseases. For many diseases, having a strong genetic risk can results in an earlier onset of presentation (e.g. Familial Hypercholesterolemia). Recognizing an increased genetic burden earlier can allow clinicians to intervene earlier and avoid delayed diagnoses. Polygenic score can be combined with traditional risk factors to increase clinical utility.  For example, polygenic risk scores my help improve diagnosis of diseases. This is especially evident in distinguishing Type 1 from Type 2 Diabetes. Likewise, a polygenic risk score based approach may reduce invasive diagnostic procedures as demonstrated in Celiac disease. Polygenic scores may also empower individuals to alter their lifestyles to reduce risk for diseases. While there is some evidence for behavior modification as a result of knowing one's genetic predisposition, more work is required to evaluate risk-modifying behaviors across a variety of different disease states. Population level screening is another use case for polygenic scores. The goal of population-level screening is to identify patients at high risk for a disease who would benefit from an existing treatment. Polygenic scores can identify a subset of the population at high risk that could benefit from screening. Several clinical studies are being done in breast cancer and heart disease is another area that could benefit from a polygenic score based screening program.

Challenges and risks in clinical contexts 
At a fundamental level, the use of polygenic scores in clinical context will have similar technical issues as existing tools. For example, if a tool is not validated in a diverse population, then it may exacerbate disparities with unequal efficacy across populations. This is especially important in genetics where a majority of the studies to date have been done in Europeans. Other challenges that can arise include how precisely the polygenic risk score can be calculated and how precise it needs to be for clinical utility. Even if a polygenic score is accurately calculated and calibrated for a population, its interpretation must be approached with caution. First, it is important to realize that polygenic traits are different from monogenic traits; the latter stem from fewer genetic loci and can be detected more accurately. Genetic tests are often difficult to interpret and require genetic counseling. Currently, polygenic-score results are being shared with clinicians. Since monogenic genetic testing is far more mature than polygenic scores, we can look there for approximating the clinical impact of polygenic scores. While some studies have found negative effects of returning monogenic genetic results to patients, the majority of studies have that negative consequences are minor.

Non-predictive applications 
A variety of applications exists for polygenic scores. In humans, polygenic scores were originally computed in an effort to predict the prevalence and etiology of complex, heritable diseases, which are typically affected by many genetic variants that individually confer a small effect to overall risk.  Additionally, a polygenic score can be used in several different ways: as a lower bound to test whether heritability estimates may be biased; as a measure of genetic overlap of traits (genetic correlation), which might indicate e.g. shared genetic bases for groups of mental disorders; as a means to assess group differences in a trait such as height, or to examine changes in a trait over time due to natural selection indicative of a soft selective sweep (as e.g. for intelligence where the changes in frequency would be too small to detect on each individual hit but not on the overall polygenic score); in Mendelian randomization (assuming no pleiotropy with relevant traits); to detect & control for the presence of genetic confounds in outcomes (e.g. the correlation of schizophrenia with poverty); or to investigate gene–environment interactions and correlations

Applications in non-human species 
The benefit of polygenic scores is that they can be used to predict the future for crops, animal breeding, and humans alike. Although the same basic concepts underlie these areas of prediction, they face different challenges that require different methodologies. The ability to produce very large family size in nonhuman species, accompanied by deliberate selection, leads to a smaller effective population, higher degrees of linkage disequilibrium among individuals, and a higher average genetic relatedness among individuals within a population. For example, members of plant and animal breeds that humans have effectively created, such as modern maize or domestic cattle, are all technically "related". In human genomic prediction, by contrast, unrelated individuals in large populations are selected to estimate the effects of common SNPs. Because of smaller effective population in livestock, the mean coefficient of relationship between any two individuals is likely high, and common SNPs will tag causal variants at greater physical distance than for humans; this is the major reason for lower SNP-based heritability estimates for humans compared to livestock. In both cases, however, sample size is key for maximizing the accuracy of genomic prediction.

While modern genomic prediction scoring in humans is generally referred to as a "polygenic score" (PGS) or a "polygenic risk score" (PRS), in livestock the more common term is "genomic estimated breeding value", or GEBV (similar to the more familiar "EBV", but with genotypic data). Conceptually, a GEBV is the same as a PGS: a linear function of genetic variants that are each weighted by the apparent effect of the variant. Despite this, polygenic prediction in livestock is useful for a fundamentally different reason than for humans. In humans, a PRS is used for the prediction of individual phenotype, while in livestock a GEBV is typically used to predict the offspring's average value of a phenotype of interest in terms of the genetic material it inherited from a parent. In this way, a GEBV can be understood as the average of the offspring of an individual or pair of individual animals. GEBVs are also typically communicated in the units of the trait of interest. For example, the expected increase in milk production of the offspring of a specific parent compared to the offspring from a reference population might be a typical way of using a GEBV in dairy cow breeding and selection.

Notes 
A.  Preprint lists AUC for pure PRS while the published version of the paper only lists AUC for PGS combined with age, sex and genotyping array information.

References

External links 
 Polygenic Risk Scores
 Polygenic Score Atlas
 Polygenic Score (PGS) Catalog: an open database of polygenic scores and the relevant metadata required for accurate application and evaluation.

Animal breeding
Plant breeding
Regression analysis
Genetics studies
Statistical genetics
Personalized medicine